Srednyaya Kamyshinka is a rural locality (a selo) in Lebyazhenskoye Rural Settlement, Kamyshinsky District, Volgograd Oblast, Russia. The population was 184 as of 2010. There are 5 streets.

Geography 
Srednyaya Kamyshinka is located in steppe, on the Volga Upland, on the Kamyshinka River, 12 km northwest of Kamyshin (the district's administrative centre) by road. Gryaznukha is the nearest rural locality.

References 

Rural localities in Kamyshinsky District